Malik Samory Hairston (born February 23, 1987) is an American professional basketball player. A shooting guard-small forward from the University of Oregon's Ducks, he was chosen in the 2008 NBA draft by the Phoenix Suns, who then traded him to the San Antonio Spurs. Hairston has also played with the San Antonio Spurs, the Austin Toros (the Spurs' D-League affiliate), Montepaschi Siena and Olimpia Milano of the Italian League, and Galatasaray of the Turkish League. He was born in Detroit, Michigan.

High school career
Prior to arriving at the University of Oregon, Hairston attended Renaissance High School in Detroit, Michigan playing alongside fellow all-American Joe Crawford, former Fordham point guard Marcus Stout, and stand-out guard Adam Sabree. His former Oregon teammate, Tajuan Porter, also attended Renaissance High School. Hairston led his high school team to a 27–0 record, the Class B state title and a No. 3 national ranking by USA Today. He was a top 10 rated recruit by virtually every publication and played in the 2004 McDonald's All-America game.

Considered a five-star recruit by Rivals.com, Hairston was listed as the No. 1 shooting guard and the No. 7 player in the nation in 2004.

College career
Hairston was an important asset for the Ducks from the moment he stepped on the floor as a freshman. Hairston and his teammates Maarty Leunen and Bryce Taylor became three of the eleven players in Oregon history to record 1,000 career points as juniors. Injuries slowed his production in 2006–2007 but Hairston was instrumental to the Ducks' late-season run and Elite Eight appearance in the 2007 NCAA Division I tournament. He scored a career-high 29 points in a 97–88 win over Western Michigan on November 12, 2007, and matched that in an 84–74 win over the Jerryd Bayless-less Arizona Wildcats on January 5, 2008. During his college career he grabbed 12 rebounds on two separate occasions, the first in a 58–56 loss to Stanford on  February 26, 2005, and in an 88–54 win over Idaho State on December 17, 2006. He closed out his career with team-highs of 22 points and 7 rebounds in a 76–69 Ducks loss to Mississippi State in the first round of the NCAA tournament.

Professional career

San Antonio Spurs
Hairston was drafted with the 18th pick in the second round (48th overall) of the 2008 NBA draft by the Phoenix Suns (which acquired the pick from the Cleveland Cavaliers as part of a trade for Milt Palacio).  He was subsequently traded to the San Antonio Spurs with cash for Goran Dragić. Hairston didn't make the roster at the end of training camp on October 26, 2008, but was re-signed by the Spurs on December 22. In his second season with the Spurs, Hairston was released in late July 2010 after the signing of Gary Neal and the subsequent log jam at the guard position.

Montepaschi Siena
On July 29, 2010, Hairston signed with the reigning Italian league champions Montepaschi Siena. Shortly after his debut for Montepaschi, he would miss three weeks after undergoing surgery for a hernia. Despite being limited to only 16 games in his first season in the Lega Basket Serie A, a healthy Hairston would find good form for Montepaschi right before the start of the Final 16 Round Robin of the EuroLeague playoffs. After finishing second in the round of sixteen, Montepaschi would advance to play Olympiacos B.C. in a best of five series in the quarterfinals.  Montepaschi would be resoundingly beat in the first game but would bounce back to win game two 82–65, with Hairston scoring 19 points and grabbing 11 boards, garnering him the Sportingbet MVP award for the game 2. Montepaschi won game 3. It would be Hairston again who would lead the way in game 5 with 25 points, 7 boards, 3 assists and a steal to again win the Sportingbet MVP Award, and in doing so becoming the first player to win the award twice in a playoff series. Montepaschi would go on to win the series and reach the Final Four of the tournament, something, they hadn't achieved in four years. They were then drawn away against Panathinaikos, where the eventual champions would beat them 77–69. Malik Hairston's 12 points and 4 rebounds weren't enough to help push them through to the finals. But as consolation, Montepaschi would compete in the third place match against Real Madrid, the team that finished above them in the round of sixteen, and win it 82–60. After a successful first season in Italy and the Euroleague Malik Hairston would leave the team to sign with Olimpia Milano.

Olimpia Milano
On July 25, 2011, Hairston officially signed a contract with Olimpia Milano. After averaging 13.9 points per game in the EuroLeague and 12.7 points in the Serie A in his first season with the team, there were rumors that the Russian team CSKA Moscow was interested in him, but eventually he signed a new two-year contract with Olimpia Milano. In his second season with Olimpia, he averaged 11.4 points per game in the EuroLeague. However, in July 2013, the president of the team confirmed in a press conference that Hairston was free to leave the team.

Galatasaray
In November 2013, Hairston signed with Galatasaray until the end of the season.

AEK Athens
On January 15, 2015, Hairston signed with AEK Athens of the Greek Basket League. On July 10, 2015, he extended his contract with AEK Athens for another two years. On August 31, 2016, Hairston's contract was officially terminated by AEK, due to failing to pass the medical examinations before the 2016–17 campaign.

Hapoel Jerusalem
On January 2, 2017, Hairston signed with Israeli club Hapoel Jerusalem for the rest of the season.

Fos Provence Basket
After not playing for a season due to injury, on August 9, 2018 Hairston signed with the French club Fos Provence Basket.

Awards and accomplishments
 2005 Pac-10 All-Freshman Team
 2006 All-Pac-10 Honorable Mention

Career statistics

NBA

Regular season

|-
| align="left" | 
| align="left" | San Antonio
| 15 || 0 || 10.3 || .490 || .000 || .286 || 1.9 || .9 || .4 || .5 || 3.3
|-
| align="left" | 
| align="left" | San Antonio
| 47 || 0 || 6.7 || .526 || .182 || .567 || 1.0 || .3 || .1 || .2 || 2.1
|- class="sortbottom"
| style="text-align:center;" colspan="2"| Career
| 62 || 0 || 7.6 || .512 || .167 || .514 || 1.2 || .5 || .2 || .3 || 2.4

EuroLeague

|-
| align="left" | 2010–11
| align="left" | Montepaschi
| 16 || 8 || 18.4 || .544 || .368 || .718 || 3.2 || 1.0 || 1.0 || .3 || 8.6 || 7.4
|-
| style="text-align:left;"| 2011–12
| style="text-align:left;"| Milano
| 12 || 4 || 24.2 || .538 || .480 || .763 || 3.1 || 1.5 || .1 || .4 || 13.9 || 12.2
|-
| style="text-align:left;"| 2012–13
| style="text-align:left;"| Milano
| 10 || 10 || 30.0 || .438 || .500 || .680 || 2.2 || 1.8 || .7 || .3 || 11.4 || 7.5
|-
| style="text-align:left;"| 2013–14
| style="text-align:left;"| Galatasaray
| 21 || 21 || 28.0 || .429 || .250 || .681 || 2.5 || 1.6 || .4 || .3 || 8.4 || 6.0
|- class="sortbottom"
| style="text-align:center;" colspan="2"| Career
| 59 || 43 || 25.1 || .462 || .383 || .709 || 2.9 || 1.4 || .5 || .3 || 10.1 || 7.9

Domestic Leagues

Regular season

|-
| 2014–15
| style="text-align:left;"| AEK
| align=left | GBL
| 30 || 24.0 ||  .562 || .393|| |.726||| 2.7 ||1.9||0.8||  | 0.5
|8.8

|}

References

External links
 NBA.com profile
 Euroleague.com profile
 Eurobasket.com profile
 Greek Basket League profile 
 Italian League profile 
 ESPN.com profile
 Oregon Ducks bio

1987 births
Living people
AEK B.C. players
African-American basketball players
American expatriate basketball people in France
American expatriate basketball people in Greece
American expatriate basketball people in Israel
American expatriate basketball people in Italy
American expatriate basketball people in Turkey
American men's basketball players
Austin Toros players
Fos Provence Basket players
Galatasaray S.K. (men's basketball) players
Hapoel Jerusalem B.C. players
McDonald's High School All-Americans
Mens Sana Basket players
Olimpia Milano players
Oregon Ducks men's basketball players
Parade High School All-Americans (boys' basketball)
Phoenix Suns draft picks
San Antonio Spurs players
Shooting guards
Small forwards
Basketball players from Detroit
21st-century African-American sportspeople
20th-century African-American people